The 2018–19 Coupe de France preliminary rounds, Paris-Île-de-France was the qualifying competition to decide which teams from the leagues of the Paris-Île-de-France region of France took part in the main competition from the seventh round.

First round 
These matches were played on 22 and 29 April and 1 and 20 May 2018. Tiers shown reflect the 2017–18 season.

Second round 
These matches were played on 30 May and 1, 2, 3, 7, 10 and 13 June 2018. Tiers shown reflect the 2017–18 season.

Third round 
These matches were played on 16 September 2018.

Fourth round 
These matches were played on 29 and 30 September 2018.

Fifth round 
These matches were played on 13 and 14 October 2018.

Sixth round 
These matches were played on 27 and 28 October 2018.

References 

2018–19 Coupe de France